The Fort Worth Sixers were a professional indoor football team founded as 2007 expansion franchise of the National Indoor Football League. The team struggled on the field during its single season in existence. The franchise folded with the league at the end of the shortened 2007 season. The Sixers/Regulators were merged after a meeting with the NIFL league president, the Sixers had a name but no players nor staff Will Williams became the head coach and general manager/president of the Sixers Williams owned the Regulators who played under both names and in two leagues the APFL and NIFL. The NIFL was struggling to stay afloat entering the season, and was simply spread too thin after changing ownership and reorganization attempt before the start of the season. Obtaining home dates was one of the team's biggest problems, as most dates were taken for other events leaving the team to book dates on mostly Sundays with a couple of options Sunday dates were considered bad dates for teams traveling from out of state. Teams proposed by the league (NIFL) in Houston San Antonio and Dallas never materialized also causing travel issues as teams were spread out nationwide, and all mostly having issues preparing for the season, Beaumont was the only other Texas team and the Sixers and Drillers played twice. Both teams also played the Conroe Storm members of the APFL and affiliate NIFL member.

Season-by-season 

|-
|2007 || 0 || 2 || 0|| 3rd Pacific South || --

The Sixers were coached by Will Williams, Roderic Boatman was the director of player personnel, Larry Hendrix served as defensive backs coach and coordinator the team consisted of only two experienced indoor players and played under the Sixers/Regulators name they played in two leagues at the same time, as members of the NIFL and the APFL. Hendrix and Boatman went on to coach with the expansion CIF Mesquite Bandits. Williams production company went on to video the Arena Football Leagues Dallas Desperados players combine at Texas Stadium and top 50 prospects invite at the Dallas Cowboys practice bubble in Valley Ranch, Williams a TV Sports Broadcaster and minor league sports team owner at the time had also been involved with the first arena football team to play in Fort Worth the Calvary of the AFL league. He had been host and producer of the pre game weekly TV show Fort Worth Calvary Weekly before that team relocated to Florida becoming the Tampa Bay Storm. Williams company also conducted practice and game video production for the Arena Football Leagues Dallas Vigilante.

References

External links
Official website
Fort Worth Sixers at Our Sports Central

National Indoor Football League teams
American football teams in the Dallas–Fort Worth metroplex
Defunct American football teams in Texas